Iqbal Town may refer to:

 Iqbal Town, Faisalabad, Pakistan
 Iqbal Town, Lahore, Pakistan